Capparis decidua, commonly known as karira, is a useful plant in its marginal habitat.

Description 
It is a small much-branched tree or shrub. It bears a mass of slender, gray-green leafless branches, the small caducous leaves being found only on young shoots.

The new flush of leaves appears in November–January. Red conspicuous flowers appear in March to April and August–September and ripe by May and October. The pink fleshy berries are readily eaten by birds. It coppices well and produces root suckers freely. It is extremely drought-resistant and tolerates some frost.

Distribution and habitat
It can be found in arid regions in North Africa, the Middle East, and South Asia, including the Thar desert.

Khair city in Uttar Pradesh, India is famous for Kair trees.

Uses

The fruit and young buds can be eaten raw.

Its spicy fruits are used for preparing vegetables, curry and fine pickles and can attract helpful insectivores; the plant also is used in folk medicine and herbalism. It can be used in landscape gardening, afforestation and reforestation in semidesert and desert areas; it provides assistance against soil erosion.

References

Sources
  (1963): Need for afforestation in the arid zones of Khair, India. LA-YAARAN 13.
  (1977): Handbook on afforestation techniques. Khair, India.
  (1975): Environmental analysis of the Thar Desert. Dehra Dun.

External links

decidua
Desert fruits
Trees of Africa
Flora of the Indian subcontinent
Garden plants of Asia
Garden plants of Africa
Drought-tolerant trees
Ornamental trees
Flora of the Thar Desert
Taxa named by Peter Forsskål